Kalyan Krishna Kurasala is an Indian film screenwriter and director known for his works primarily in Telugu cinema. He made his directorial debut in 2016 with Soggade Chinni Nayana and went on direct Rarandoi Veduka Chudham (2017) Nela Ticket (2018) and Bangarraju (2022).

After making Nela Ticket, he took a break from movies due to the death of his brother followed by COVID-19 pandemic in India. He made a comeback with Bangarraju, released in 2022.

Filmography

References

External links

Indian film directors
Living people
Telugu film directors
Year of birth missing (living people)
Andhra University alumni